Monica M Moses Haller (born 1980) is an American photographer. She produced the book Riley and His Story with Riley Sharbonno and Matt Rexac, part of the Veterans' Book Project which she co-runs, both of which are about wars in Iraq and Afghanistan. Haller is a 2010 recipient of a Guggenheim Fellowship.

Life and work
Haller was born in Minneapolis. She has an undergraduate degree in Peace and Conflict Studies and an M.F.A. in Visual Studies from the Minneapolis College of Art and Design and a BA studying Philosophy of Violence and Non-Violence from the College of St. Benedict.

Martin Parr and Gerry Badger include Riley and His Story in the third volume of their photobook history, in which they describe it as "more about what the Iraq War did to those involved in it than about the justice of the cause, although its futility — and that of all war — is clearly implied."
Riley and His Story is the first volume in a project by Haller, Matthew Rezac and Mark Fox called the Veterans' Book Project. The project involves veterans of the Iraq and Afghanistan wars publishing their stories and photographs, made while on duty, as a form of catharsis.

Fellowships 
 2005: University of Minnesota Law School
 2007–2009: Bush Foundation Fellowship for Visual Artists
 2009–2010: McKnight Foundation Fellowship for Photographers
 2010: Guggenheim Fellowship

Publications 
 Riley and His Story. Me and my outrage. You and us. Paris: Onestar; Värnamo, Sweden: Fälth & Hässler, 2009. Photos and text by Riley Sharbonno; edit, concept and cover text by Haller; and design by Matthew Rezac and Haller. .  Edition of 1000 copies.
 Second printing, 2010. Edition of 1000 copies.

Exhibitions

Solo exhibitions 
 Beneath the Ground, Minneapolis Institute of Art, Minneapolis, Minnesota, 2014
 The Veterans Book Project, Nomas Foundation, Rome, Italy, 2011/12. Curated by Stefano Chiodi.

Group exhibitions 
 The War From Here, group show with Lisa Barnard, Nina Berman, Haller, Sophie Ristelhueber, and Martha Rosler at Krakow Photmonth, Krakow, Poland, 2017. Curated by Gordon MacDonald.

References 

American women photographers
Artists from Minneapolis
Living people
1980 births
College of Saint Benedict and Saint John's University alumni
Minneapolis College of Art and Design alumni
21st-century American women